Henry Rodríguez may refer to:
Henry Rodríguez (outfielder) (born 1967), Major League Baseball outfielder that played from 1992 to 2002
Henry Rodríguez (pitcher) (born 1987), baseball pitcher
Henry Rodríguez (infielder) (born 1990), baseball infielder